Thaisella chocolata is a species of sea snail, a marine gastropod mollusk, in the family Muricidae, the murex snails or rock snails.

Description
The length of the shell attains 77.7 mm.

Distribution
This marine species is endemic to the west coast of South America: (Chile, Ecuador and Peru). The snail is found in the intertidal zone and is quite common on rocky shores, both in sheltered waters and on the open coast.

References

 Claremont M., Vermeij G.J., Williams S.T. & Reid D.G. (2013) Global phylogeny and new classification of the Rapaninae (Gastropoda: Muricidae), dominant molluscan predators on tropical rocky seashores. Molecular Phylogenetics and Evolution 66: 91–102.

External links
 Duclos (P. L.). (1832). Description de quelques espèces de pourpres, servant de type à six sections établies dans ce genre. Annales des Sciences Naturelles. 26: 103-112.
  Lesson, R. P. (1840). Molluscorum species novae. Revue Zoologique par la Société Cuvierienne. 3: 355-356
 Bishogai data base
 Investigaciones marinas

chocolata
Gastropods described in 1832